is a Japanese voice actress from Tokyo. She is affiliated with Haikyō. Her major roles include Megumi Tadokoro  in Food Wars: Shokugeki no Soma, Midoriko in Selector Infected Wixoss, Ojou in Please Tell Me! Galko-chan, Lucoa in Miss Kobayashi's Dragon Maid and Saturn in Hi-sCoool! SeHa Girls.

Personal life
On October 14, 2022, it was announced Takahashi would go on hiatus due to a throat condition.

Filmography

Anime

OVA

Anime film

Video games

References

External links
 Official agency profile 
 

Living people
Voice actresses from Tokyo
Japanese video game actresses
Japanese voice actresses
1990 births
21st-century Japanese actresses
Tokyo Actor's Consumer's Cooperative Society voice actors